Tartus ( / ALA-LC: Ṭarṭūs; known in the County of Tripoli as Tortosa and also transliterated from French Tartous) is a city on the Mediterranean coast of Syria. It is the second largest port city in Syria (after Latakia), and the largest city in Tartus Governorate. Until the 1970s, Tartus was under the governance of Latakia Governorate, then it became a separate governorate. The population is 458,327 (2023 estimate).In the summer it is a vacation spot for many Syrians. Many vacation compounds and resorts are located in the region. The port holds a small Russian naval base.

Etymology
The Phoenician founders named the city Antarados (from  → Antarados or Anti-Aradus, meaning "The town facing Arwad"). In Latin, its name became Tortosa. The original name survives in its Arabic form as Ṭarṭūs, from which the French Tartous and English Tartus derive.

History

Phoenician Antaradus 

The History of Tartus goes back to the 2nd millennium BC when it was founded as a Phoenician colony of Aradus. The colony was known as Antaradus. Not much remains of the Phoenician Antaradus, the mainland settlement that was linked to the more important and larger settlements of Aradus, off the shore of Tartus, and the nearby site of Amrit.

Greco-Roman and Byzantine 
 

The city was called Antaradus in Latin. Athanasius reports that, under Roman Emperor Constantine the Great, Cymatius, the Orthodox bishop of Antaradus and also of Aradus (whose names indicate that they were neighbouring towns facing each other) was driven out by the Arians. At the First Council of Constantinople in 381, Mocimus appears as bishop of Aradus. At the time of the Council of Ephesus (431), some sources speak of a Musaeus as bishop of Aradus and Antaradus, while others mention only Aradus or only Antaradus. Alexander was at the Council of Chalcedon in 451 as bishop of Antaradus, Paulus as bishop of Aradus, while, at a synod held at Antioch shortly before, Paulus took part as bishop of both Aradus and Antaradus. In 458, Atticus signed, as bishop of Aradus, the letter of the bishops of the province of Phoenicia Prima to Byzantine Emperor Leo I the Thracian protesting about the murder of Proterius of Alexandria. Theodorus or Theodosius, who died in 518, is mentioned as bishop of Antaradus in a letter from the bishops of the province regarding Severus of Antioch that was read at a synod held by Patriarch Mennas of Constantinople. The acts of the Second Council of Constantinople in 553 were signed by Asyncretius as bishop of Aradus. At the time of the Crusades, Antaradus, by then called Tartus or Tortosa, was a Latin Church diocese, whose bishop also held the titles of Aradus and Maraclea (perhaps Rachlea). It was united to the see of Famagosta in Cyprus in 1295.

No longer a residential bishopric, Antaradus is today listed by the Catholic Church as a titular see.

The city was favored by Constantine for its devotion to the cult of the Virgin Mary. The first chapel to be dedicated to the Virgin have been built here in the 3rd century.

Early Islamic era 
Islamic rule was established  in Syria in 634. In the years before, Arab merchants would spread the word of Islam and locals embraced the new religion while others continued to practice their respective faiths. During the Arab conquest of the Levant, caliphate armies conquered Tartus under the leadership of Ubadah ibn al-Samit in 636. While Ubadah occupied Tartus, Mu'awiya I came to the city, and built an Amsar complex within the city, while also tasking fiefs to the garrison commanders. Tartus hosted Khadijah, the wife of Muhammad when she came with her father Khuwaylid ibn Asad.

Crusades 

The Crusaders called the city Antartus, and also Tortosa. It was captured in 1099 during the First Crusade, Frankish forces captured Tortosa in 1099. Once the land was seized, the cathedral was built over the spot of a Byzantine church. but it was later taken over by Muslims, before it was recaptured by Raymond of Saint-Gilles in February 1102 after two weeks of siege, then it was left in 1105 to his son Alfonso Jordan and was known as Tortosa. In 1123 the Crusaders built the semi-fortified Cathedral of Our Lady of Tortosa over a Byzantine church that was popular with pilgrims.

In 1152, Tortosa was handed to the Knights Templar, who used it as a military headquarters. They engaged in some major building projects, constructing a castle around 1165 with a large chapel and an elaborate keep, surrounded by thick double concentric walls. The Templars' mission was to protect the city and surrounding lands, some of which had been occupied by Christian settlers, from Muslim attack. Nur ad-Din Zangi captured Tartus from the Crusaders for a brief time before he lost it again.

The city of Tortosa was recaptured by Saladin in 1188, and the main Templar headquarters relocated to Cyprus. However, in Tortosa, some Templars were able to retreat into the keep, which they continued to use as a base for the next 100 years. They steadily added to its fortifications until it also fell, in 1291. Tortosa was the last outpost of the Templars on the Syrian mainland, after which they retreated to a garrison on the nearby island of Arwad, which they held for another decade. After the occupation by the Mamluks, the city lost its prestige, which it regained only under the Ottoman rule.

Ottoman era

During the Ottoman rule, the city gained importance mainly due to trade with Cyprus and Europe. At the turn of the 18th and 19th centuries, it became one of the coastal defense points due to its strategic port. In 1832, at the beginning of the First Egyptian-Ottoman War, the city and its surroundings were conquered by Muhammad Ali Pasha, then ruler of Egypt.

In 1839, the Ottoman Empire decided to reconquer its Syrian coastal territories from Egypt with the support of Great Britain. Despite heavy losses among the marines, the British were unable to capture the fort. After the war, the city returned to the Ottoman Empire, where it remained until 1918.

Modern era

On May 23, 2016, the Islamic State of Iraq and the Levant claimed responsibility for three suicide bombings at a bus station in Tartus, which had remained largely unaffected since the Syrian Civil War began in 2011. Purportedly targeting Alawite gatherings, the bombs killed 48 people. In Jableh, similarly insulated, another four bombers killed over a hundred people.

Geography 

The city lies on the eastern coast of the Mediterranean Sea bordered by the Syrian Coastal Mountain Range to the east. Arwad, the only inhabited island on the Syrian coast, is located a few kilometers off the shore of Tartus. Tartus occupies most of the coastal plain, surrounded to the east by mountains composed mainly of limestone and, in certain places around the town of Souda, basalt.

Climate

Tartus has a Mediterranean climate (Köppen (Csa) with mild, wet winters, hot and dry summers, and short transition periods in April and October. The hills to the east of the city create a cooler climate with even higher rainfall. Tartus is known for its relatively mild weather and high precipitation compared to inland Syria.

Economy

Industry and navy

Tartus is an important trade center in Syria and has one of the two main ports of the country on the Mediterranean. The city port is experiencing major expansion as a lot of Iraqi imports come through the port of Tartus to aid reconstruction efforts in Iraq. There is a cement plant in the city with a production capacity of 6.5 thousand tons of cement per day. The pharmaceutical industry is also represented in the city, since the beginning of the conflict in the country, seven pharmaceutical factories have been opened and another 3 are under construction. Food, chemical and wood processing industries are also represented in the urban industrial zone.

The service sector is one of the most attractive sectors for employment in the city of Tartus. As a high percentage of its inhabitants with good scientific qualifications work in the service sector, and they are distributed between the public and private sectors, although the participation of the private sector is still below the required level compared to other coastal cities in the Mediterranean.

Also in the city there is a recording and distribution studio King Recording, which was previously located in Aleppo and was forced to move from there due to the war.

Tourism

Tartus is a favorite destination for tourists and a beautiful modern city with its buildings, markets, modern resorts, tourist facilities and port. As for beaches of Tartous, it is a beautiful extension of the Syrian coast, with a length of about 90 km, with soft sand, chalets, hotels, cafes and marine restaurants that are scattered on it. The city has seen some investments in the last few years. The largest being Antaradus and Porto waterfront development.

Russian naval base

Tartus hosts a Soviet-era naval supply and maintenance base, under a 1971 agreement with Syria, which is still staffed by Russian naval personnel. Tartus is the last Russian military base outside the former Soviet Union, and its only Mediterranean fueling spot, sparing Russia's warships the trip back to their Black Sea bases through straits in Turkey, a NATO member.

Culture

Art and festivals

Many cultural and literary events, art festivals and theater are held in the city, and in the summer, the activities of the Tartous Art Festival are held in the presence of distinguished Syrian and Arab artists, in addition to a tourist festival called Antaradus.

Assi Rahbani and Mansour Rahbani were visiting Tartous very often because of their admiration for the place in which they stayed and the good memories they carried from the house in which they stayed in a waterfront, they immortalized that visit by composing the song Shabab Al-Hilweh in Tartous sung by Nasri Shamseddine. Among the composers whose name is associated with Tartous and Husayn al-Baher is the musician Safwan Bahlawan Ibn Arwad who has a distinguished performance in the pub and his artistic presence on the Arab art scene. 

The natives also include the singer Farrah Yousef, finalist of the singing competition Arab Idol and Taim Hasan, an actor known known for his dramatic roles in Syria and the Arab world. 

Many poets and writers lived in Tartous, including Saadallah Wannous, Muhammad Omran, Rasha Omran and Nadim Muhammad, and there are writers who hold their literary seminars and lectures in the city cultural center.

Museum

St. Mary's Cathedral was originally built in the 12th century as a Templar church. The cathedral was used as a mosque after the Muslim capture of the city, then as a barracks by the Ottomans. It was renovated under the French Mandate and since 1956, the building has housed the National Museum of Tartus, which exhibits antiquities recovered from Amrit and many other places in the region.

In September 2021, the Directorate-General of Antiquities has begun a comprehensive renovation  and fixing operations of architectural elements that were subjected to fragmentation at the National Museum of Tartus.

Sports

Tartus is the home city of only one sports club: Al-Sahel SC, founded in 1971. 4 types of sports are being practiced by the club including: football, basketball, table tennis and bodybuilding. The club plays in both stadiums in the city: Municipal  (capacity 1,300) and Bassel Al-Assad (capacity 8,000).

In 2018, Al-Sahel promoted to the Syrian Premier League for the first time in their history. In the 2020-21 season, they were relegated and have been playing in the Syrian League 1st Division ever since. The women's basketball team competes at the top level of the Syrian basketball league.

Education
A number of colleges affiliated to Tishreen University in Latakia, such as the College of Arts and the College of Technical Engineering, were opened as part of the government's policy to expand higher education among the various Syrian cities.  

The city also has a number of institutes, secondary schools and primary schools affiliated to the Ministry of Education, in addition to many private educational institutes and secondary schools.

Local infrastructure

Tartous has expanded and developed a lot like other cities Syria. The city has recently witnessed a great urban development, which was manifested in the significant increase in the number of organized suburbs, not to mention the increase in the city's organizational plan to include new areas. It is worth noting that there are beautiful gardens in the city that constitute a real outlet for the people of the city, such as Al-Basel Park and others.

In addition to the new sea corniche, which gives the city a special charm. The city attracts many people from other Syrian governorates, Europe and Arab countries to spend time here and enjoy the charming sea view. In this unforgettable city, its individuality is clear and has its own character, as it is surrounded by mountains and forests that embrace the most beautiful landscapes of nature.

Transportation

Tartus has a developed road system. Tartus and Latakia are connected by the M1 international highway, and the city is connected to Damascus by the M5 highway via Homs. The establishment of an international road linking Tartus with Iraq and the Arab Gulf through the Syrian Desert was recently studied, as it is the shortest road connecting the Arab Gulf to the Mediterranean and thus Europe from the Port of Tartus. The main commercial coastal road of the city is Al-Thawra Street, named after 1963 March Revolution.

The railway network operated by Chemins de Fer Syriens connects Tartus with other cities in Syria, although currently only the Latakia-Tartus and Tartus-Al Akkari-Homs passenger connections are in service. The restoration of the rail link with Iraq (IRR) and the proposal to extend the railway from Al-Qaim in Iraq through Al-Bukamal in Syria to Homs for a total distance of 270 kilometers and thence to Tartus are currently (2022) under discussion.

Main sights 

The historic centre of Tartus consists of more recent buildings built on and inside the walls of the Crusader-era Templar fortress, whose moat still separates this old town from the modern city on its northern and eastern sides. Outside the fortress few historic remains can be seen, with the exception of the former Romanesque-Gothic cathedral Cathedral of Notre-Dame of Tartus, from the 12th century.

 
Tartus and the surrounding area are rich in antiquities and archeological sites. Various important and well known sites are located within a 30-minute drive from Tartus. These attractions include:
 The old city of Tartus.
 Margat Castle, north of the city.
 The historic town of Safita.
 Arwad island and castle.
 The ancient Cathedral of Our Lady of Tortosa, now used as the city museum.
 Beit el-Baik Palace.
 Sheikh Saleh al-Ali shrine in Al-Shaykh Badr.
 Hosn Suleiman Temple.
 Drekish town-resort.

Aside from these historic sites, more modern attractions include:
 Alrimal Alzahabeya beach resort.
 Junada hotel (previously called Porto Tartous).
 Holiday beach resort.
 Mashta Al Helou resort.

The outlying town of Al Hamidiyah just south of Tartus is notable for having a Greek-speaking population of about 3,000 who are the descendants of Ottoman Greek Muslims from the island of Crete but usually confusingly referred to as Cretan Turks. Their ancestors moved there in the late 19th century as refugees from Crete after the Kingdom of Greece acquired the island from the Ottoman Empire following the Greco-Turkish War of 1897. Since the start of the Iraqi War, a few thousand Iraqi nationals now reside in Tartus.

International relations

Twin towns — sister cities

Tartus is twinned with:

 Kütahya, Turkey
 Piraeus, Greece (2022)
 Tortosa, Spain (2007)

Notable people 

 Saadallah Wannous (1941–1997), playwright and first Arab to deliver the International Theatre Day address
 Sheikh Saleh Al-Ali, pre-independence Syrian revolutionary who fought against the French mandate
 Dr. Halim Barakat, novelist, sociologist and retired research professor
 Mohammad Yousaf Abu al-Farah Tartusi, Muslim saint of the Junaidia order
 Jamal Suliman, actor
 Taim Hasan, actor
 Farrah Yousef, singer and Arab Idol Season 2 finalist
 Assef Shawkat, former deputy Minister of Defense of Syria and brother-in-law of Syrian President Bashar al-Assad
 Mohsen Saeed Hussein Khaddour, Syrian Arab Army officer known as Lion of Al-Badia

References

External links 

 Articles, stories and posts about Tartous (Tartus)
 Sea Side by Mariyah and Abufares. A novel with the backdrop of the Syrian coast and Tartous
 Tartus Port
 Abufares said... the world according to a Tartoussi, an English blog from Tartous
 eTartus - a website for Tartus news and services

 
People from Tartus
Cities in Syria
Populated coastal places in Syria
Populated places in Tartus District
Castles and fortifications of the Kingdom of Jerusalem
Coloniae (Roman)
Mediterranean port cities and towns in Syria
Castles and fortifications of the Knights Templar
Phoenician cities